The San Mateo County Board of Supervisors is the five-member elected body that supervises the operation of San Mateo County, California. Board members represent one of five districts of roughly equal population within the county, elected, since a 2012 charter change, only by voters in their own district. The current board members are Dave Pine (District 1), Carole Groom (District 2), Don Horsley (District 3), Warren Slocum (District 4), and David Canepa (District 5).

Election results 

 
Warren Slocum replaced termed-out District 4 Supervisor Rose Jacobs Gibson in January 2013 in the last at-large vote for Supervisor due to the passage of Measure B, mandating supervisorial elections by voters of the same district.

An all-mail-ballot special election was held to fill the vacancy created when Supervisor Mark Church resigned to assume office as San Mateo County Chief Elections Officer & Assessor-County Clerk-Recorder on January 3, 2011. The six candidates were San Mateo Union High School District Board President Dave Pine, San Mateo County Community College District Board of Trustees President Richard Holober, Millbrae City Council member Gina Papan, Burlingame Mayor Terry Nagel, retired aerospace engineer Demetrios Nikas, and victim advocate Michael Stogner.

References

External links 
 San Mateo County Board of Supervisors Website

County government in California